Dheeraj Verma (22 October 1967 – 7 June 2021) was an Indian comic book artist and creator. He is often credited with being the first Indian to enter the US comics industry.

Early life 

Dheeraj Verma was born on 22 October 1967, in Delhi, India. He attended school at N P Boys Sr Secondary School and graduated from Pannalal Girdharlal Dayanand Anglo Vedic College, University of Delhi in 1991. Dheeraj spent his life in the heart of the capital, Connaught Place. As an aspiring artist he started drawing "The Phantom, Batman and Superman" in his 3rd grade. He was quite impressed with "The Phantom and Flash Gordon" which became his inspiration to draw.

Career 
Verma started his career as an illustrator in the Indian comic industry in 1991 with the New Delhi-based publishers Parampara Comics and Fort Comics. He was noticed by the industry with Divaystro Ka Raja, Ajoobey (Parampara Comics) and garnered more attention from the Indian comics industry with the comics  Jangaroo (Fort Comics). Later, in December 1993, he moved on to Raj Comics, the leading Indian comic company of the time. There he created his famous one-of-a-kind wolfman character Bheriya. Bheriya (wolfman) represents Verma’s immense love and dedication towards wild life and nature, which have always been the strongest aspects of his lifestyle. His debut issue in Raj Comics was Bheria Aya in 1994. He also wrote as well as illustrated its initial issues which were a huge hit such as Wolfano, Grahano, Lazy, Tilangey and many more. He worked on almost all the major Raj comics characters as an artist. His best selling comics were from the 90’s, and all of them were drawn by him. He also worked on covers, posters, trading cards, pin-ups, and other promotional merchandising for Raj comics. Verma was the first artist to introduce digital coloring to the Indian comic industry in 1996 on Parmanus cover and then Bheria's Digest. He worked with Raj comics until April 2000. He joined a gaming company Escosoft Tech. (Division of Escort) as a senior visualizer and worked there for three years until June 2003.

In 2004, he got his big break in the American comic industry with Avatar Press where he worked as an artist for writer Joe R. Lansdale on By Bizarre Hands. His biggest series with Avatar was Escape of the Living Dead, Plague of the Living Dead, Yuggoth Creatures, Nightmare on Elm Street, and Night of the Living Dead. He also worked on Dynamite’s The Complete Dracula series written by Alan Moore’s daughter Leah Moore. He also did cover art for Marvel Comics's invincible Iron Man. He worked on Transformers' series published by IDW Publications. His first series for IDW Transformers: Fall Of Cybertron was a superhit series on ComiXology, which was launched in August 2012. After this series he worked on Transformers: Robots in Disguise # 19 in July 2013 and it entered in Top 300 comics.

He has done up to 14 issues of Lady Death.

He was working on Conan the Slayer (Dark Horse comics, USA), as a penciller.

In January 2013, after a decade away, Verma made his comeback in the Indian comic industry with Jaljeevni (Bheria Series) from Raj Comics. Subhasya Sheegram (Doga), Sarvanayak series was his latest project with Raj Comics.

Verma also ventured to exhibit his painting in the world renowned Indian Government national academy of fine arts Lalit Kala Akademi in Delhi, and caused quite a buzz in the fine art circle by introducing original comics pages from Transformers and Lady Death in the gallery in a seven-day exhibition, which was inaugurated by Mr. Taj Hassan, Special Commissioner of Police.

Personal life and death 
Verma married Malti Verma in 1991 and had two daughters. Verma died on 7 June 2021, in Delhi from pulmonary fibrosis complicated by a COVID-19 infection.

Works 

A:
A Nightmare on Elm Street: Fearbook
Amanecer Zombie

B:
Bheria Series - Titles
1. Bheria
   
2. Bheria Aaya
   
3. Elephanto
   
4. Green Gold
   
5. Bhura Billa
   
6. Blast
   
7. Lazy Bheria
   
8. Meen Bheria
   
9. Laskula
   
10. Lutera Sher
   
11. Wolfa
   
12. Grahno
   
13. Tilange
   
14. Bali
   
15. Nahi Rahega Aatank
   
16. Baagad Billi
   
17. Bhatiki Ka Jaal
   
18. Bheria ka Kanoon
   
19. Hatyara
   
20. Ladake
   
21. Achook
   
22. Nagor
   
23. Maut Ke Parkale
   
24. Kaigula
   
25. Gajara
   
26. Maut Mere Andar
   
27. Indrajaal
   
28. Mogambo
   
29. Andhi Dhund
   
30. Totampol
   
31. Ayi Musibat
   
32. Jinda Pathar
   
33. Kala Sona
   
34. Jaag Kritya Jaag
   
35. Janwar
   
36. Bhujang
   
37. Neeli Lashein
   
38. Kobi aur Bheria
   
39. Mera Jungle
   
40. Aag aur Paani
   
41. Jen
   
42. Chaaro Khane Chit
   
43. Doma
   
44. Balikuthar
   
45. Bheel
   
46. Masaba
   
47. Bachna Mushkil
   
48. Budha Jungle
   
49. Bhaago Pagal Aaya
   
50. Kshetra
  
51. Thoo Thoo
   
52. Maaramari
   
53. Hurdang
   
54. Bura Na Mano
   
55. Apni Raksha Aap
   
56. Kadam Kadam Par
   
57. Pathar Kobi Pathar Bheria
   
58. Kaantein
   
59. Yuvraj
   
60. Bheria Vansh
   
61. Marr gya Bheria
   
62. Kobi Bajaye Baja
   
63. Jungle Jungle Maut Chali
   
64. Apshakun
   
65. Maut Na Maar Koi
   
66. Jal Utha Jungle
   
67. King Luna
   
68. Ajooba
   
69. Jeetega Thodanga
   
70. Dekh Tabahi Lakdi Ki
   
71. Wohi Puarana Jallad
   
72. Maut Kshetra
   
73. Chhupa Kabra
   
74. Sardar Kobi
   
75. Ashwa
   
76. Condor
   
77. Maut Jaegi Khali Haath
   
78. Jungle Paar
   
79. Kala Bheria
   
80. Kaise Ladu Kaise Bhidu
   
81. Uttradhikari
   
82. Jungle Meri Muthi Mein
   
83. Kale Log Musibat Bhog
   
84. Mai Bhi Rakshak
   
85. Jungle Ka Beta
   
86. Tarzoo
   
87. Jungle Sharir
   
88. Jungle Sabka Hai
   
89. Jungle Khali Karo
   
90. Asli Nakli
   
91. Yahi Hai Kobi
   
92. Aadamkhor Bheria
   
93. Gajbola
   
94. Ek Gin Ek Bheria
   
95. Chero Pao Maut
   
96. Jaan Par Bhari
   
97. Ichcha Aur Dhari
   
98. Pinjer
   
99. Prem Bala
   
100. Prem Na Khoon
   
101. Prem Hiran
   
102. Avdhoot
   
103. Prem Pishach
   
104. Prem Tadap
   
105. Prem Prateek
   
106. Prem Ratan
   
107. Prem Ashru
   
108. Prem Shradh
  
109. Van Rakshak
   
110. Shaapit Rakshak
   
111. Aahuti
   
112. Bheria Kaun
   
113. Bheria Ki Khoj
   
114. Jaan Ke Laale
   
115. Kobi Bhai
   
116. Ek Myaan Do Talwaarein
By Bizarre Hands
1. Issue #1 
   
2. Issue #2: Not from Detroit
   
3. Issue #3: The Pit
   
4. Issue #4: Tight Little Stitches In A Dead Man's Back
   
5. Issue #5: Night They Missed The Horror Show
   
6. Issue #6: God of The Razor/My Dead Dog, Bobby

C:
Caliber Rounds
Conan The Slayer
1. Issue #12: The Devil in Iron Part Six

D:
Deadly Inferno: Battle of The Wilderness

E:
Escape of The Living Dead
Escape of The Living Dead: Airborne
Escape of The Living Dead: Fearbook
Escape of The Living Dead: Trade Paperback Collected Edition
Escape of The Living Dead: Resurrected

G:
G.I. Joe
1. Issue #1: The Fall of G.I. Joe Part One
   
2. Issue #2: The Fall of G.I. Joe Part Two
   
3. Issue #3: The Fall of G.I. Joe Part Three
   
4. Issue #4: The Fall of G.I. Joe Part Four
   
5. Issue #5: The Fall of G.I. Joe Part Five
   
6. Issue #6: The Fall of G.I. Joe Part Six
   
7. Issue #7: The Fall of G.I. Joe Part Seven
   
8. Issue #8: The Fall of G.I. Joe Conclusion
Grimm Fairy Tales presents Alice In Wonderland One-Shot

I:
Iron Man 2.0
1. Issue #1: Palmer Addley Is Dead Part One
   
2. Issue #2: Palmer Addley Is Dead Part Two
   
3. Issue #3: Palmer Addley Is Dead Part Three
   
4. Issue #4: Palmer Addley Is Dead Part Four
   
5. Issue #5: Fear Itself Part One
   
6. Issue #6: Fear Itself Part Two
   
7. Issue #7: Fear Itself
   
8. Issue #7.1
   
9. Issue #8: The Palmer Addley Infection
   
10. Issue #9: The Palmer Addley Infection, Part Two
   
11. Issue #10: The Palmer Addley Infection, Part Three
   
12. Issue #11: The Palmer Addley Infection, Part Four
   
13. Issue #12: The Palmer Addley Infection, Conclusion

K:
Kade: Sun of Perdition

L:
Lady Death
1. Lady Death: Unholy Ruin

2. Lady Death: Apocalyptic Abyss

3. Lady Death: Hellraiders

4. Lady Death: Hot Shots

5. Lady Death: Chaos Rules

6. Lady Death: Damnation Game

7. Lady Death: Extinction Express
   
8. Lady Death: Oblivion Kiss

9. Lady Death: Merciless Onslaught

Lynx
1. Issue #1: Call Me G-d!

2. Issue #2: Lynx Origin

3. Issue #3: Phone Home

4. Issue #4: Who is Yahweh?

N:
Night of The Living Dead: The Beginning
Night of The Living Dead: Just a Girl
Night of The Living Dead: Hunger
Night of The Living Dead: New York
Night of The Living Dead: TPB
Night of The Living Dead: Death Valley
Night of The Living Dead: Aftermath

P:
Plague of The Living Dead
Plague of The Living Dead Special
Project 26

S:
Snow White One-Shot

T:
The Complete Dracula
The Transformers Series - Fall of Cybertron Issues
1. Issue #1: Good Intentions
   
2. Issue #2: Secrets

3. Issue #3: Siege Mentality

4. Issue #4: Last Stand

5. Issue #5: Fragmentation

6. Issue #6: Fall
The Transformers: Robots In Disguise
1. Issue #1: The Autonomy Lesson

2. Issue #2: The World And Everything In It

3. Issue #3: Stick Together

4. Issue #4: Devisive

5. Issue #5: A Better Tomorrow

6. Issue #6: Syndromica (1)

7. Issue #7: Inference Patterns

8. Issue #8: Dinobot Hunt

9. Issue #9: Night And The City

10. Issue #10: Syndromica

11. Issue #11: The End Of The Beginning Of The World

12. Issue #12: City On Fire

13. Issue #13: The Verge

14. Issue #14: Before The Dawn

15. Issue #15: Plan For Everything

16. Issue #16: Heavy Is The Head

17. Issue #17: Dark Cybertron Prelude - Shockwaves

18. Issue #18: Dark Cybertron Prelude - Second Exodus

19. Issue #19: Dark Cybertron Prelude - Homecoming

20. Issue #20: Dark Cybertron Prelude - Three Monologues - 1. Long Night, 2. Young Evening, 3. Early Dawn

21. Issue #21: Dark Cybertron Prelude - Shockpoint

22. Issue #22: Dark Cybertron Prelude - Soundwaves

23. Issue #23: "Winners & Losers" - Dark Cybertron Chapter 3

24. Issue #24: Finest Hour - Dark Cybertron Chapter 5

25. Issue #25: The Dead Are Not Enough - Dark Cybertron Chapter 7

26. Issue #26: Finis Temporis - Dark Cybertron Chapter 9

27. Issue #27: Black Planet - Dark Cybertron Chapter 11

28. Issue #28: EarthFall Part 1 - Hello Cruel World

29. Issue #29: EarthFall Part 2 - Detonation Boulevard

30. Issue #30: EarthFall Part 3 - The Mind Bomb
   
31. Issue #31: EarthFall Part 4 - Full Fathom Five
   
32. Issue #32: EarthFall Part 5 - I Dream of Wires
   
33. Issue #33: The World Of Tomorrow
   
34. Issue #34: The Crucible
The X-Files/Transformers: Conspiracy

Y:
Yuggoth Creatures
Alan Moore's Yuggoth Creatures And Other Growths

Z:
Zombie Dawn: Safe House

References

External links
 Exclusive Interview with Dheeraj Verma : Transformers to Batman

1967 births
2021 deaths
Artists from Delhi
Indian graphic novelists
Deaths from the COVID-19 pandemic in India